Put Your Needle Down is the second studio album by American duo the Secret Sisters. It was released on April 14, 2014 under Universal Republic Records.

Critical reception

Steve Leggett of AllMusic writes, "This set might not be as insularly perfect as the Secret Sisters' first album, but it's ultimately just as impressive, if not more so"

Jim Beviglia of American Songwriter gives the album 3½ out of a possible 5 stars and writes, "Their second full-length, Put Your Needle Down, keeps the focus on their mesmerizing harmonies but still demonstrates intriguing artistic progression."

Scott Recker reviews the album for PopMatters and gives it 7 out of a possible 10 stars. He begins his review by saying, "If the 2010 self-titled debut from the Secret Sisters proved that siblings Laura and Lydia Rogers could find success with something traditional, its follow-up, Put Your Needle Down, shows that they aren't going to stay in anyone else’s shadow."

Beville Dunkerley announces the release of the Deluxe edition through Cracker Barrel stores at Rolling Stone magazine and writes, "Produced by T Bone Burnett, the album has those same throwback harmonies that put the Secret Sisters on the music map with their 2010 debut, but with more contemporary melodies on several of the tracks this time around."

Track listing

Personnel

The Secret Sisters
Laura Rogers- vocals
Lydia Rogers- vocals, acoustic guitar

Additional musicians
Jack Ashford - tambourine, wood block
Jay Bellerose - drums
T Bone Burnett - acoustic guitar, electric guitar
Keefus Ciancia - keyboards, piano
Zach Dawes - bass guitar
Woody Jackson - electric guitar
Gurf Morlix - electric guitar
Marc Ribot - banjo, resonator guitar, slide guitar
Martin Tillmann- cello
Casey Waits- drums
Darren Weiss- drums
Gabe Witcher- upright bass, fiddle, string arrangements, strings

Chart positions

References

External links
The Secret Sisters Official Site
Republic Records Official Site
Cracker Barrel Music Official Site

2014 albums
The Secret Sisters albums
Republic Records albums
Albums produced by T Bone Burnett